Domingo Francisco Sánchez Corvalán (20 March 1795 – 1 March 1870) was a Paraguayan politician and statesman who served as the Vice President of Paraguay during the administration of Francisco Solano López from 1865 to 1870. Sánchez was one of the few officials who worked in the administrations of Gaspar Rodríguez de Francia, Carlos Antonio López and Solano López.

On 1 March 1870, he died in combat with Brazilian soldiers at the Battle of Cerro Corá, the last battle of the Paraguayan War, alongside Solano López and Secretary of State Luis Caminos.

References 

1795 births
1870 deaths
Paraguayan military personnel killed in action
People from Asunción
Paraguayan military personnel of the Paraguayan War
Vice presidents of Paraguay